Kfar Yassine is a village in the Keserwan District of the  Keserwan-Jbeil in Lebanon. It is part of the municipality of Tabarja-Adma wa Dafneh-Kfar Yassine. The municipality is located 24 kilometers north of Beirut. Its average elevation is 10 meters above sea level and its total land area is 456 hectares. Kfar Yassine's inhabitants are predominantly Maronite Christians.

References

Populated places in Keserwan District
Maronite Christian communities in Lebanon